The 1972 United States presidential election in Louisiana took place on November 7, 1972. All 50 states and the District of Columbia were part of the 1972 United States presidential election. State voters chose ten electors to the Electoral College, who voted for president and vice president.

Louisiana was won by the Republican nominees, incumbent President Richard Nixon of California and his running mate Vice President Spiro Agnew of Maryland. Nixon and Agnew defeated the Democratic nominees, Senator George McGovern of South Dakota and his running mate U.S. Ambassador Sargent Shriver of Maryland.

Nixon carried Louisiana with 65.32% of the vote to McGovern's 28.35%, a victory margin of 36.97%, making Louisiana 13.8% more Republican than the nation-at-large, and marking the strongest Republican presidential performance in Louisiana history. In a result that would reflect McGovern's national performance, the Democratic candidate only won one parish (West Feliciana) in Louisiana. , this is the last election when Iberville Parish, Madison Parish, St. James Parish, St. Helena Parish, East Carroll Parish, and the city of New Orleans have voted for a Republican presidential candidate.

With 4.95 percent of the popular vote, Louisiana would prove to be American Party candidate John G. Schmitz’ fifth strongest state after Idaho, Alaska, Utah and Oregon.

Results

Results by parish

See also
 United States presidential elections in Louisiana

References

Louisiana
1972
United States presidential election